Carlos Vicente Tenorio Medina (born 14 May 1979) is an Ecuadorian former footballer who last played for Ecuadorian club Atlético Saquisilí. From 2001 to 2009, he represented the Ecuador national football team.

Club career

Tenorio began his club career with LDU Quito in the Ecuadorian Serie B, helping them regain promotion to Serie A in the 2001 season by topping the division with Tenorio scoring 11 league goals. In 2003, Tenorio won the Serie A title with LDU Quito. Afterwards he joined Saudi Arabian club Al-Nassr for one season, scoring 15 goals in 16 appearances. From 2003 to 2009, Tenorio played in Qatar for Al Sadd, winning three Qatar Stars League titles, before moving to Al-Nasr in the United Arab Emirates. In 2012, Tenorio returned to South America, playing for various clubs including Vasco da Gama who were relegated from the Brazilian Série A in 2013, and Bolívar who topped the Bolivian Primera División in 2014–15. He returned to Quito for one season in 2016.

International career

Tenorio has represented his nation at the FIFA World Cup in 2002 and 2006. In the 2006 World Cup, he scored against Poland and Costa Rica as Ecuador progressed to the second round.

Career statistics

National team

Notes

References

External links

 
 (Sky Sports article)
 (FEF card)

1979 births
Living people
Ecuadorian footballers
Ecuador international footballers
Ecuadorian expatriate footballers
2002 CONCACAF Gold Cup players
2002 FIFA World Cup players
2006 FIFA World Cup players
2007 Copa América players
L.D.U. Quito footballers
Al Nassr FC players
Al Sadd SC players
Al-Nasr SC (Dubai) players
CR Vasco da Gama players
C.D. El Nacional footballers
Club Bolívar players
Sport Boys Warnes players
Qatar Stars League players
Campeonato Brasileiro Série A players
UAE Pro League players
Association football forwards
Saudi Professional League players
Expatriate footballers in Saudi Arabia
Expatriate footballers in Qatar
Expatriate footballers in the United Arab Emirates
Expatriate footballers in Brazil
Expatriate footballers in Bolivia
Ecuadorian expatriate sportspeople in Saudi Arabia
Ecuadorian expatriate sportspeople in Qatar
Ecuadorian expatriate sportspeople in the United Arab Emirates
Ecuadorian expatriate sportspeople in Brazil
Ecuadorian expatriate sportspeople in Bolivia